"Bad Luck Charm" is the first single released from the album, Magic Recoveries, by post-hardcore Finnish band, Disco Ensemble. It was released in Finland on 20 May 2008, reaching number seven in the Finnish singles chart.

Track listing
 "Bad Luck Charm (Radio Edit)" - 3:57

References

2008 singles
2008 songs
Disco Ensemble songs
Universal Music Group singles